Muna Khalif, popularly known as Muna Kay, is a Somali-American entrepreneur, fashion designer and legislator. She is the founder and CEO of the Muna Kay brand. Khalif also serves as an MP in the Federal Parliament of Somalia, and she's elected from Southwest region.

Personal life

Muna Khalif (full name - Muna Khalif Sheikh Abuu) was born in Somalia. Her family is from the Tunni clan. After the civil war broke out in her place of birth, she and her parents emigrated to the United States. Khalif studied nursing at college. She later also took courses in fashion design.

Career

Muna Kay
Khalif is the founder and CEO of Muna Kay, an eponymous clothing line that caters to the Islamic market. She established the brand in order to provide young Muslim women with fashionable attire that adheres to prescribed standards of modesty. Khalif later launched Baby Norah, an infant garment collection named after her daughter.

As of 2016, the Muna Kay company operates internationally, with retail outlets in North America, East Africa and Dubai. It also has a manufacturing hub in China.

Additionally, Khalif is the president of the Muna Kay Foundation. The philanthropic organization offers help to the disadvantaged, and provides artisanal training and mentorship to women and girls.

Federal Parliament of Somalia

In November 2016, Khalif presented herself as a candidate for a legislative seat in the Lower House of the Federal Parliament of Somalia. She was elected a representative for the South West State, earning 41 ballots.

An electoral oversight body later called for a reelection on the grounds that Khalif and seven other MPs had not met the ballot threshold. The Supreme Court upheld this ruling. However, the decision was eventually overturned by the Federal Parliament, with the Lower House instead authorizing the incumbency of Khalif and the other lawmakers.

References

External links

Living people
Ethnic Somali people
American people of Somali descent
Somalian businesspeople
Somalian politicians
1990s births
African-American Muslims